Alexis Amber "Lexie" Priessman (born January 23, 1997) is a former American artistic gymnast. She has represented the U.S. in various international competitions and was a National Team member from 2010 through to 2013.

Personal life
She was born in Cincinnati, Ohio, the daughter of Kraig and Vickie Priessman, and started training in gymnastics at the age of five. She has a brother Nicholas, a sister Jenna, and a twin sister Leah. Nicholas plays baseball at the Eastern Illinois University. Jenna is a member of the cheerleading team at the University of Cincinnati, and Leah is a dancer.

She is currently attending Louisiana State University and is signed to their college gymnastics team.

Junior career

2010
Priessman made her national debut at the 2010 Nastia Liukin Supergirl Cup in Worcester, Massachusetts, where she won the all-around.

At the 2010 CoverGirl Classic in Chicago, IL, Priessman tied for second on vault with gymnast McKayla Maroney. She placed sixth all-around and on floor exercise, and she placed eighth on uneven bars.

Priessman placed second on vault at the 2010 U.S. Junior National Championships in Hartford, Connecticut, and she placed seventh on floor.

2011
In September, Priessman captured the all-around title (55.70) at the 2011 Japan Junior International in Yokohama, Japan. Competing her Amanar, she won the vault title with a meet-high score of 15.8. On balance beam (12.8), her skills included a standing full and a tucked full-in dismount. Her bars set (13.8) featured a giant full to Tkatchev, a toe-blind to Jaeger and a double layout dismount.  On floor (13.30), she tumbled a double-double first pass, a 1 1/2 to 2 1/2, and a tucked full-in.

At the 2011 U.S. Junior Gymnastics Championships in St. Paul, Minnesota during August, Priessman claimed her first national vault title, with a two-night score of 31.55. She placed second on floor exercise (29.150) behind winner Katelyn Ohashi, and she tied for seventh on uneven bars with gymnast Amelia Hundley (27.45).

In July, Priessman claimed the junior vault title at the 2011 CoverGirl Classic Marshmallow Champion in Chicago, Illinois.  She won the silver medals in the all-around and floor exercise.  She also placed third on balance beam and eighth on bars.

In the junior division of the 2011 City of Jesolo Trophy in Jesolo, Italy, Priessman won vault and earned a share of the U.S. team gold medal.  She placed fourth all-around and fifth on uneven bars. She also competed two new skills at the meet: a standing full and a tourjete half.

2012
At the Pacific Rim Championships in Everett, Washington, Priessman helped the USA team to win the gold medal ahead of China and Canada. Priessman finished second in the all-around with a 57.800. She earned a gold medal on vault scoring a 15.325, placed fourth on uneven bars and sixth on balance beam.

Priessman competed at the City of Jesolo Trophy in 2012. She helped the USA team to win the team gold medal ahead of Italy and Russia. Individually, Priessman won the all-around title with a 56.950. She placed first on vault with a 15.850, second on uneven bars scoring a 14.700 and third on floor exercise with a 14.200.

At the Secret US Classic in Chicago, IL, Priessman finished fourth in the all-around with a 57.050 in the junior session. She placed fifth on uneven barswith a 13.950, third on balance beam scoring a 14.300 and first on floor exercise with a 14.650.

At the 2012 U.S. Junior Gymnastics Championships, Priessman became the 2012 Junior US National Floor Exercise and All-Around Champion. She also earned silver medals on vault and uneven bars.

In October, Priessman verbally committed to the gymnastics program at the University of Georgia.

Senior career

2013 
Priessman competed at the Secret U.S Classic. She placed twelfth with a score of 43.900 because she didn't compete on beam. After, she was touted to compete at the P&G Championships. She was at the competition but didn't compete.

2014 
Priessman decided to leave her gym, Cincinnati Gymnastics Academy. She had trained at CGA for 12 years. As of 2014, she was training at Perfection Gymnastics School.

Priessman was scheduled to compete at the 2014 Secret U.S. Classic but withdrew due to injury.

Priessman officially signed to the LSU Lady Tigers gymnastics program on November 12, 2014, and planned to attend LSU, starting in fall 2015.

2015 
On June 6, 2015, Priessman posted a photo on her Instagram account, announcing that she would be retiring from elite gymnastics and confirming her college attendance in the fall of this year. The photo is a photocollage of her and McKenna Kelley.

College career

2016
Priessman joined the LSU program for the 2015–16 season. Academically, she planned to major in mass communication.

References

1997 births
Living people
American female artistic gymnasts
Sportspeople from Cincinnati
Louisiana State University alumni
Cincinnati Gymnastics Academy
NCAA gymnasts who have scored a perfect 10
U.S. women's national team gymnasts
21st-century American women
LSU Tigers women's gymnasts